The Act 5 Geo 3 c 45, sometimes called the Customs, etc. Act 1765, the Customs Act, the Duties Act, or the American Act, was an Act of the Parliament of Great Britain. This Act aimed to encourage imports to Great Britain from its American dominions, under the system of Trade and Navigation Acts. The Act encouraged the import of timber products; repealed the inland duty on coffee, imposed in 1758; imposed an inland duty on all coffee imported from foreign sources; altered the existing bounties and drawbacks on sugar exports; repealed part of the Iron Act, which prohibited bar iron made in the colonies from being exported from Great Britain, or carried along its coast; and regulated the fees of the customs officers in the colonies.

Specifically mentioned in the preamble were "deals, planks, boards and timbers" for so that the "Royal Navy... may be furnished with such materials at more reasonable rates, and great sums of money at present expended among foreign nations, for the purchase of such materials, may be saved." The Act goes on to enumerate the several sums payable as reward or premium directly to the merchants.

The encouragement of the coffee trade with the American dominions was in the Act similarly promoted.  From section 14 to section 18 the Act promoted the sugar trade; between section 19 and 21 the rice trade; sections 22 and 23 promoted the iron trade.

References
Chronological Table of and Index to the Statutes. Thirteenth Edition Printed for HMSO. 1896. Volume 1. p 123.

Great Britain Acts of Parliament 1765